Savannah City Hall is the seat of government for the city of Savannah, Georgia, United States. Designed by architect Hyman Witcover, the building was built between 1904 and 1905 and opened the following year. It is a contributing property to the Savannah Historic District.

History 
The location for the city hall was formerly home to the City Exchange, which had been built in 1799 and was demolished in 1904. Following the building's demolition, the cornerstone for the city hall was laid on August 11, 1904 in a large ceremony. The architect behind the project was Hyman Witcover, who is notable for several other buildings in the area, while construction was handled by the Savannah Contracting Company. The construction occurred during the administration of Savannah Mayor Herman Myers, who pursued numerous public works projects during his tenure as mayor. Commenting on the building, Myers reported that, "it will typify the twentieth century Savannah, the Savannah of indomitable energy, of punishing progressiveness," and that the building is "a monument to the progressive spirit that marks the Savannah of today." The building was the first building built solely to serve as the seat of government for the city.

The construction of the building cost upwards of $250,000 and was completed in 1905. The building, located across the street from the United States Customhouse, is an example of Renaissance Revival architecture and featured an exterior of limestone and granite, capped by a copper dome. Initial plans called for four statues of chariots on the tops of the building's four corners, but financial limitations prevented this. The building officially opened on January 2, 1906. In 1987, the dome was covered in gold leaf. In 2014, the Georgia Historical Society, working with the mayor and aldermen, erected a Georgia historical marker at the city hall.

References

Bibliography

External links 
 
 

1905 establishments in Georgia (U.S. state)
Government buildings in Savannah, Georgia
City and town halls on the National Register of Historic Places in Georgia (U.S. state)
Clock towers in Georgia (U.S. state)
Government buildings completed in 1905
Historic district contributing properties in Georgia (U.S. state)
Renaissance Revival architecture in Georgia (U.S. state)
Savannah Historic District